The 2003–04 Columbus Blue Jackets season was the Blue Jackets' fourth season in the NHL, as the team was coming off of a 29–42–8–3 record in the 2002–03 season, earning 69 points to finish in last place in the Western Conference for the second-straight year.

Off-season
Columbus would undergo some changes during the off-season, as leading scorer and team captain Ray Whitney would leave to sign with the Detroit Red Wings. The Blue Jackets named veteran defenseman Luke Richardson the third captain in franchise history.

Regular season
The Blue Jackets would get off to a solid start in 2003–04, winning three of their first four games, though the club would eventually go on a seven-game losing streak to quickly fall out of playoff contention. Columbus would continue to struggle, and General Manager and Head Coach Doug MacLean announced on January 1, 2004, that he would step down from head coaching duties, naming Blue Jackets assistant coach and former NHL player Gerard Gallant as his replacement. Columbus posted a 9–21–4–3 record under MacLean. While the Blue Jackets would play better hockey with Gallant behind the bench, the team would fail once again to earn a playoff spot, as they finished the season with a 25–45–8–4 record for 62 points—seven fewer than the previous season—and finish 29 points the Nashville Predators for the eighth and final playoff spot in the Western Conference. Columbus, however, climbed out of the basement in the Central Division for the first time in franchise history after finishing ahead of the Chicago Blackhawks.

Rick Nash had a memorable season, finishing in a three-way tie with Ilya Kovalchuk from the Atlanta Thrashers and Jarome Iginla from the Calgary Flames to win the Maurice "Rocket" Richard Trophy as the League's highest goal-scorer; he scored a club-record 41 goals and finished with a team-best 57 points.  David Vyborny led the Blue Jackets with 31 assists and finished second to Nash with 53 points. Rookie Nikolai Zherdev also contributed a solid 34 points in 57 games. On defense, Anders Eriksson led the Jackets with 27 points, while Jaroslav Spacek contributed with 22 points in just 58 games. Jody Shelley provided the team toughness, earning a team-high 228 penalty minutes.

In goal, Marc Denis was the team's number one, playing a team-high 66 games, winning 21 of them, posting a team best 2.56 goals against average (GAA) and earning five shutouts.

The Blue Jackets would finish the season having tied the Dallas Stars for most times shut-out, with 11.

Season standings

Schedule and results

|- align="center" bgcolor="#ffbbbb"
| 1 || October 9 || Columbus Blue Jackets || 1–2 || Atlanta Thrashers || 0–1–0–0 || 0 || 
|- align="center" bgcolor="#bbffbb"
| 2 || October 11 || New York Rangers || 0–5 || Columbus Blue Jackets || 1–1–0–0 || 2 || 
|- align="center" bgcolor="#bbffbb"
| 3 || October 13 || Vancouver Canucks || 2–3 || Columbus Blue Jackets || 2–1–0–0 || 4 || 
|- align="center" bgcolor="#bbffbb"
| 4 || October 16 || Chicago Blackhawks || 1–2 || Columbus Blue Jackets || 3–1–0–0 || 6 || 
|- align="center" bgcolor="#ffbbbb"
| 5 || October 18 || Columbus Blue Jackets || 2–3 || Nashville Predators || 3–2–0–0 || 6 || 
|- align="center" bgcolor="#ffbbbb"
| 6 || October 22 || Columbus Blue Jackets || 1–4 || Detroit Red Wings || 3–3–0–0 || 6 || 
|- align="center" bgcolor="#ffbbbb"
| 7 || October 23 || Tampa Bay Lightning || 1–0 || Columbus Blue Jackets || 3–4–0–0 || 6 || 
|- align="center" bgcolor="#ffbbbb"
| 8 || October 25 || Dallas Stars || 3–2 || Columbus Blue Jackets || 3–5–0–0 || 6 || 
|- align="center" bgcolor="#ffbbbb"
| 9 || October 28 || Columbus Blue Jackets || 3–6 || Vancouver Canucks || 3–6–0–0 || 6 || 
|- align="center" bgcolor="#ffffbb"
|10 || October 30 || Columbus Blue Jackets || 3–4 || Edmonton Oilers || 3–6–0–1 || 7 || 
|-

|- align="center" bgcolor="#ffbbbb"
|11 || November 1 || Columbus Blue Jackets || 0–3 || Calgary Flames || 3–7–0–1 || 7 || 
|- align="center" bgcolor="#bbffbb"
|12 || November 7 || Atlanta Thrashers || 2–4 || Columbus Blue Jackets || 4–7–0–1 || 9 || 
|- align="center" bgcolor="#bbffbb"
|13 || November 9 || Calgary Flames || 3–4 || Columbus Blue Jackets || 5–7–0–1 || 11 || 
|- align="center" 
|14 || November 11 || Columbus Blue Jackets || 1–1 || Montreal Canadiens || 5–7–1–1 || 12 || 
|- align="center" bgcolor="#ffbbbb"
|15 || November 13 || Columbus Blue Jackets || 2–5 || Ottawa Senators || 5–8–1–1 || 12 || 
|- align="center" bgcolor="#ffbbbb"
|16 || November 14 || Boston Bruins || 4–0 || Columbus Blue Jackets || 5–9–1–1 || 12 || 
|- align="center" 
|17 || November 16 || Phoenix Coyotes || 2–2 || Columbus Blue Jackets || 5–9–2–1 || 13 || 
|- align="center" bgcolor="#ffbbbb"
|18 || November 19 || Columbus Blue Jackets || 1–5 || Detroit Red Wings || 5–10–2–1 || 13 || 
|- align="center" bgcolor="#bbffbb"
|19 || November 20 || Detroit Red Wings || 0–3 || Columbus Blue Jackets || 6–10–2–1 || 15 || 
|- align="center" bgcolor="#bbffbb"
|20 || November 22 || New York Islanders || 1–2 || Columbus Blue Jackets || 7–10–2–1 || 17 || 
|- align="center" 
|21 || November 25 || Edmonton Oilers || 3–3 || Columbus Blue Jackets || 7–10–3–1 || 18 || 
|- align="center" bgcolor="#ffbbbb"
|22 || November 26 || Columbus Blue Jackets || 2–4 || Nashville Predators || 7–11–3–1 || 18 || 
|- align="center" bgcolor="#ffbbbb"
|23 || November 29 || Washington Capitals || 5–3 || Columbus Blue Jackets || 7–12–3–1 || 18 || 
|-

|- align="center" bgcolor="#bbffbb"
|24 || December 2 || Mighty Ducks of Anaheim || 1–2 || Columbus Blue Jackets || 8–12–3–1 || 20 || 
|- align="center" bgcolor="#ffbbbb"
|25 || December 4 || Nashville Predators || 4–2 || Columbus Blue Jackets || 8–13–3–1 || 20 || 
|- align="center" bgcolor="#ffbbbb"
|26 || December 6 || Columbus Blue Jackets || 1–5 || Colorado Avalanche || 8–14–3–1 || 20 || 
|- align="center" 
|27 || December 10 || Philadelphia Flyers || 1–1 || Columbus Blue Jackets || 8–14–4–1 || 21 || 
|- align="center" bgcolor="#ffffbb"
|28 || December 12 || St. Louis Blues || 3–2 || Columbus Blue Jackets || 8–14–4–2 || 22 || 
|- align="center" bgcolor="#ffbbbb"
|29 || December 13 || Columbus Blue Jackets || 3–5 || Pittsburgh Penguins || 8–15–4–2 || 22 || 
|- align="center" bgcolor="#ffffbb"
|30 || December 16 || Columbus Blue Jackets || 1–2 || St. Louis Blues || 8–15–4–3 || 23 || 
|- align="center" bgcolor="#ffbbbb"
|31 || December 19 || Calgary Flames || 2–1 || Columbus Blue Jackets || 8–16–4–3 || 23 || 
|- align="center" bgcolor="#ffbbbb"
|32 || December 20 || Columbus Blue Jackets || 2–5 || Minnesota Wild || 8–17–4–3 || 23 || 
|- align="center" bgcolor="#ffbbbb"
|33 || December 23 || Phoenix Coyotes || 2–1 || Columbus Blue Jackets || 8–18–4–3 || 23 || 
|- align="center" bgcolor="#bbffbb"
|34 || December 26 || Columbus Blue Jackets || 4–1 || Chicago Blackhawks || 9–18–4–3 || 25 || 
|- align="center" bgcolor="#ffbbbb"
|35 || December 27 || Dallas Stars || 4–3 || Columbus Blue Jackets || 9–19–4–3 || 25 || 
|- align="center" bgcolor="#ffbbbb"
|36 || December 29 || St. Louis Blues || 3–2 || Columbus Blue Jackets || 9–20–4–3 || 25 || 
|- align="center" bgcolor="#ffbbbb"
|37 || December 31 || San Jose Sharks || 1–0 || Columbus Blue Jackets || 9–21–4–3 || 25 || 
|-

|- align="center" bgcolor="#bbffbb"
|38 || January 2 || Columbus Blue Jackets || 2–0 || Tampa Bay Lightning || 10–21–4–3 || 27 || 
|- align="center" bgcolor="#ffbbbb"
|39 || January 3 || Columbus Blue Jackets || 0–1 || Florida Panthers || 10–22–4–3 || 27 || 
|- align="center" bgcolor="#ffbbbb"
|40 || January 6 || Columbus Blue Jackets || 0–6 || Colorado Avalanche || 10–23–4–3 || 27 || 
|- align="center" bgcolor="#bbffbb"
|41 || January 8 || Columbus Blue Jackets || 3–2 || San Jose Sharks || 11–23–4–3 || 29 || 
|- align="center" 
|42 || January 10 || Columbus Blue Jackets || 2–2 || Los Angeles Kings || 11–23–5–3 || 30 || 
|- align="center" 
|43 || January 11 || Columbus Blue Jackets || 2–2 || Mighty Ducks of Anaheim || 11–23–6–3 || 31 || 
|- align="center" bgcolor="#ffbbbb"
|44 || January 15 || Columbus Blue Jackets || 3–5 || St. Louis Blues || 11–24–6–3 || 31 || 
|- align="center" bgcolor="#bbffbb"
|45 || January 16 || Los Angeles Kings || 2–3 || Columbus Blue Jackets || 12–24–6–3 || 33 || 
|- align="center" 
|46 || January 18 || Edmonton Oilers || 4–4 || Columbus Blue Jackets || 12–24–7–3 || 34 || 
|- align="center" bgcolor="#bbffbb"
|47 || January 21 || St. Louis Blues || 1–3 || Columbus Blue Jackets || 13–24–7–3 || 36 || 
|- align="center" bgcolor="#ffbbbb"
|48 || January 22 || Columbus Blue Jackets || 0–7 || Chicago Blackhawks || 13–25–7–3 || 36 || 
|- align="center" bgcolor="#bbffbb"
|49 || January 24 || Chicago Blackhawks || 3–4 || Columbus Blue Jackets || 14–25–7–3 || 38 || 
|- align="center" bgcolor="#ffbbbb"
|50 || January 27 || New Jersey Devils || 4–3 || Columbus Blue Jackets || 14–26–7–3 || 38 || 
|- align="center" bgcolor="#ffbbbb"
|51 || January 29 || Nashville Predators || 6–4 || Columbus Blue Jackets || 14–27–7–3 || 38 || 
|- align="center" bgcolor="#bbffbb"
|52 || January 31 || Minnesota Wild || 1–2 || Columbus Blue Jackets || 15–27–7–3 || 40 || 
|-

|- align="center" 
|53 || February 2 || Columbus Blue Jackets || 3–3 || Phoenix Coyotes || 15–27–8–3 || 41 || 
|- align="center" bgcolor="#ffbbbb"
|54 || February 4 || Columbus Blue Jackets || 0–1 || Dallas Stars || 15–28–8–3 || 41 || 
|- align="center" bgcolor="#bbffbb"
|55 || February 11 || Los Angeles Kings || 2–3 || Columbus Blue Jackets || 16–28–8–3 || 43 || 
|- align="center" bgcolor="#ffbbbb"
|56 || February 12 || Columbus Blue Jackets || 1–4 || Toronto Maple Leafs || 16–29–8–3 || 43 || 
|- align="center" bgcolor="#ffffbb"
|57 || February 14 || San Jose Sharks || 2–1 || Columbus Blue Jackets || 16–29–8–4 || 44 || 
|- align="center" bgcolor="#bbffbb"
|58 || February 16 || Nashville Predators || 2–4 || Columbus Blue Jackets || 17–29–8–4 || 46 || 
|- align="center" bgcolor="#ffbbbb"
|59 || February 18 || Columbus Blue Jackets || 1–3 || Mighty Ducks of Anaheim || 17–30–8–4 || 46 || 
|- align="center" bgcolor="#ffbbbb"
|60 || February 20 || Columbus Blue Jackets || 2–3 || Phoenix Coyotes || 17–31–8–4 || 46 || 
|- align="center" bgcolor="#ffbbbb"
|61 || February 21 || Columbus Blue Jackets || 3–4 || Los Angeles Kings || 17–32–8–4 || 46 || 
|- align="center" bgcolor="#ffbbbb"
|62 || February 23 || Columbus Blue Jackets || 2–4 || San Jose Sharks || 17–33–8–4 || 46 || 
|- align="center" bgcolor="#ffbbbb"
|63 || February 25 || Chicago Blackhawks || 4–3 || Columbus Blue Jackets || 17–34–8–4 || 46 || 
|- align="center" bgcolor="#bbffbb"
|64 || February 27 || Columbus Blue Jackets || 4–3 || Chicago Blackhawks || 18–34–8–4 || 48 || 
|- align="center" bgcolor="#bbffbb"
|65 || February 28 || Colorado Avalanche || 4–5 || Columbus Blue Jackets || 19–34–8–4 || 50 || 
|-

|- align="center" bgcolor="#bbffbb"
|66 || March 2 || Columbus Blue Jackets || 3–0 || Carolina Hurricanes || 20–34–8–4 || 52 || 
|- align="center" bgcolor="#ffbbbb"
|67 || March 3 || Columbus Blue Jackets || 2–4 || Dallas Stars || 20–35–8–4 || 52 || 
|- align="center" bgcolor="#ffbbbb"
|68 || March 6 || Vancouver Canucks || 4–0 || Columbus Blue Jackets || 20–36–8–4 || 52 || 
|- align="center" bgcolor="#ffbbbb"
|69 || March 8 || Carolina Hurricanes || 4–1 || Columbus Blue Jackets || 20–37–8–4 || 52 || 
|- align="center" bgcolor="#ffbbbb" 
|70 || March 11 || Detroit Red Wings || 4–2 || Columbus Blue Jackets || 20–38–8–4 || 52 || 
|- align="center" bgcolor="#ffbbbb"
|71 || March 13 || Columbus Blue Jackets || 3–5 || St. Louis Blues || 20–39–8–4 || 52 || 
|- align="center" bgcolor="#ffbbbb"
|72 || March 14 || Columbus Blue Jackets || 2–3 || Minnesota Wild || 20–40–8–4 || 52 || 
|- align="center" bgcolor="#ffbbbb"
|73 || March 16 || Columbus Blue Jackets || 2–3 || Edmonton Oilers || 20–41–8–4 || 52 || 
|- align="center" bgcolor="#ffbbbb"
|74 || March 18 || Columbus Blue Jackets || 0–2 || Calgary Flames || 20–42–8–4 || 52 || 
|- align="center" bgcolor="#bbffbb"
|75 || March 21 || Columbus Blue Jackets || 5–4 || Vancouver Canucks || 21–42–8–4 || 54 || 
|- align="center" bgcolor="#bbffbb"
|76 || March 24 || Minnesota Wild || 0–2 || Columbus Blue Jackets || 22–42–8–4 || 56 || 
|- align="center" bgcolor="#bbffbb"
|77 || March 26 || Mighty Ducks of Anaheim || 1–3 || Columbus Blue Jackets || 23–42–8–4 || 58 || 
|- align="center" bgcolor="#bbffbb"
|78 || March 27 || Columbus Blue Jackets || 3–2 || Nashville Predators || 24–42–8–4 || 60 || 
|- align="center" bgcolor="#ffbbbb"
|79 || March 29 || Columbus Blue Jackets || 0–6 || Buffalo Sabres || 24–43–8–4 || 60 || 
|- align="center" bgcolor="#ffbbbb"
|80 || March 31 || Detroit Red Wings || 3–2 || Columbus Blue Jackets || 24–44–8–4 || 60 || 
|-

|- align="center" bgcolor="#ffbbbb"
|81 || April 2 || Colorado Avalanche || 4–2 || Columbus Blue Jackets || 24–45–8–4 || 60 || 
|- align="center" bgcolor="#bbffbb"
|82 || April 3 || Columbus Blue Jackets || 4–1 || Detroit Red Wings || 25–45–8–4 || 62 || 
|-

|-
| Legend:

Player statistics

Scoring
 Position abbreviations: C = Center; D = Defense; G = Goaltender; LW = Left Wing; RW = Right Wing
  = Joined team via a transaction (e.g., trade, waivers, signing) during the season. Stats reflect time with the Blue Jackets only.
  = Left team via a transaction (e.g., trade, waivers, release) during the season. Stats reflect time with the Blue Jackets only.

Goaltending

Awards and records

Awards

Transactions
The Blue Jackets were involved in the following transactions from June 10, 2003, the day after the deciding game of the 2003 Stanley Cup Finals, through June 7, 2004, the day of the deciding game of the 2004 Stanley Cup Finals.

Trades

Players acquired

Players lost

Signings

Draft picks
Columbus' draft picks at the 2003 NHL Entry Draft held at the Gaylord Entertainment Center in Nashville, Tennessee.

Notes

References

 
 
National Hockey League Guide & Record Book 2007

Columbus
Columbus Blue Jackets seasons
Col
Blue
Blue